TBC1D30 is a gene in the human genome that encodes the protein of the same name. This protein has two domains, one of which is involved in the processing of the Rab protein. Much of the function of this gene is not yet known, but it is expressed mostly in the brain and adrenal cortex.

Gene 
TBC1D30, also known as KIAA0984, is a protein in the 12th chromosome of the human genome at 12q14.3. The gene for the protein includes two domains: the RabGAP-TBC domain, and the DUF4682 domain. This gene spans 100,076 base pairs in the human genome, but gets condensed down into 7,931 bp for the mRNA transcript, and finally 944 amino acids in its isoform X1 with 12 exons.

Transcripts 
There are 9 isoforms of TBC1D30, 3 of which are independent of the genome build.

The first three in the list are independent of the reference genome. The latter 6, labelled with an X, are based on NC_000012.12 Reference GRCh38.p13 Primary Assembly. The domains for each isoform that contains domains are the same RabGAB-TBC and DUF4682 domains. The size column shows the number of amino acids in each protein isoform.

Protein 
TBC1D30 has an isoelectric point of about 8.5. Antibodies revealed TBC1D30 to have a molecular weight of about 90 kDa.

Gene level regulation 

The most likely promoter for TBC1D30 is about 1,279 base pairs, with a start at 64,779,516 and an end at 64,780,794.

The TBC1D30 protein has been found in or associated with the cytoplasm and the plasma membrane from antibody studies.

The protein is mostly found to be expressed in tissues of the brain and adrenal glands.

Transcript level regulation 
There is a microRNA binding site within the 3' UTR of the TBC1D30 gene for the hsa-miR-194-5p miRNA. This microRNA is involved in the Wnt/Beta-catenin signaling pathway.

Protein level regulation 
The protein contains some possible myristoylation, amination, and phosphorylation sites. There are also some degradation sites within the RabGAP-TBC domain.

Homology and evolution 
TBC1D30 has a large amount of orthologs. Analysis of these homologs allow us to ascertain the most important amino acids, i.e., the ones that are conserved. The most highly conserved amino acids among vertebrates, invertebrates, fungi, plants, bacteria and protists with available sequences were trp236, arg255, trp259, ile297, asp300, arg303, thr304, leu321, leu325, ala327, gly336, tyr337, cys338, gln339, leu349, glu356, pro399, trp432, trp450, asp451, arg463, and leu466.
The RabGAP domain within the gene originated approximately 4 billion years ago, as it is present within Terriglobus roseus, which is an acidobacterium that diverged from humans 4.09 billion years ago. The whole gene likely originated approximately 1.3 billion years ago, as there are still amino acids conserved past the RabGAP domain, and into the DUF4682 domain for Lithospermum erythrorhizon and Nicotiana attenuata. These two plants diverged from humans about 1.275 billions years ago.
 

The gene is evolving at a slower pace than Fibrinogen alpha, which evolves very quickly, but at a faster pace than Cytochrome C, which evolves very slowly.

Interacting proteins 
TBC1D30 likely interacts with STX3, ZRANB1 and ESR1. These interactions were found through affinity capture and Western blot, affinity capture and mass spectrometry, and two-hybrid screening respectively.

Clinical significance 
A Single Nucleotide Polymorphism (SNP), rs11615287, at the start of the RabGAP-TBC domain is likely to be damaging to the protein.

Studies have investigated how TBC1D30 affects insulin processing.

References 

Human genome projects